is a passenger railway station in located in the city of Ayabe, Kyoto Prefecture, Japan, operated by JR West.

Lines

Station layout
The station consists of two ground-level opposed side platforms connected by a footbridge. The station is unattended.

Platforms

Adjacent stations

History
Umezako Station opened on November 3, 1904. With the privatization of the Japan National Railways (JNR) on April 1, 1987, the station came under the aegis of the West Japan Railway Company.

Passenger statistics
In fiscal 2016, the station was used by an average of 90 passengers daily (boarding passengers only)

Surrounding area
 Japan National Route 27
 Ankoku-ji

See also
List of railway stations in Japan

External links

 0631602 Umezako Station Official Site

Railway stations in Kyoto Prefecture
Railway stations in Japan opened in 1904
Ayabe, Kyoto